Roproniidae is a family of wasps in the order Hymenoptera, of which only two genera are still extant, the others being fossils.

Extant genera
 Ropronia Provancher, 1887
 Xiphyropronia He & Chen, 1991

Fossil genera
 † Beipiaosirex Hong, 1983 Haifanggou Formation, China, Middle Jurassic (Callovian)
 † Jeholoropronia Ren, 1995 Yixian Formation, China Early Cretaceous (Aptian)
†Mesohelorus Martynov 1925  Haifanggou Formation, China, Middle Jurassic (Callovian), Karabastau Formation, Middle-Late Jurassic (Callovian/Oxfordian)
 † Mesoropronia Rasnitsyn, 1990 Turga, Russia, Early Cretaceous (Aptian)
 † Paleoropronia Garrouste et al., 2016 Menat Formation, France, Paleocene
†Protohelorus Kozlov 1968 Karabastau Formation, Middle-Late Jurassic (Callovian/Oxfordian)
†Phoriostephanus Engel & Huang, 2016 Burmese amber, Myanmar, Late Cretaceous (Cenomanian) (originally assigned to Stephanidae)

References

Proctotrupoidea